Thondayad Junction is an important intersection of Kozhikode city, India. This junction connects the city to the eastern town of Kozhikode District  so the traffic is heavy. The junction also connects to the northern and southern cities of Kerala by express roads.

History

100 years ago the beach area were the centre of Kozhikode city.  In the 1970s the downtown shifted to Mananchira area and again, in the 1980s, Mavoor Road became the centre of attraction.  In 2010s, Thondayad Bypass area and Palazhi on the Airport road has emerged as the new city centre with a vibrant night life for foodies.

Mavoor Road
The road to the west takes you to Arayidathupalam, City Bus Stations and Mananchira pond.

Medical College Road
The road to the east goes to Chevayur, Kovoor, Medical College, Karanthur, Kunnamangalam and Mavoor village.

Kannur Road
The road to the north goes to Koyilandy, Vatakara, Thalassery and Kannur.

Airport Road
The road to the south goes to Pantheerankavu, Ramanattukara and the Calicut International Airport

Major Landmarks in Thondayad
 Vigilance and Anti-corruption office
 Eham Digital
Edumart Hypermarket Mavoor Road
 Chinmaya Vidyalaya
 Narakath Bhagavathy Temple
 Azhthya Kovil Maha Vishnu Goshala Temple
 Mark developers villas Kavu stop Thondayadu
 Kavu Nagar

See also
 Airport Road, Kozhikode

References

Roads in Kozhikode